Kapitan Awesome (lit. Captain Awesome) is the first comedy fantasy afternoon series to be aired on TV5 from February 19, 2012, to May 5, 2013, replacing Bagets: Just Got Lucky. Lead actors are Andrew E., Martin Escudero and Empoy Marquez.

Synopsis
Efren lives a simple life with his father Adonis, who owns a Siomai shop. But, he doesn't know, that Adonis had invented a power siomai for Efren, and when he eats it, he becomes an ugly but 80's looking superhero known as Kapitan Awesome.

Cast and characters

Main cast
 Martin Escudero as Efren
 Empoy Marquez as Kapitan Awesome
 Andrew E. as Adonis
 Alwyn Uytingco as Baste/Kapitan Perfect
 Aki Torio as Jacky
 Alchris Galura as Waway
 Stephanie Sol as Lana Hiya
 Shy Carlos as Dina Lang
 Ritz Azul as Love
 Morissette Amon as May Sayad
 Janvier Daily as Ador
 Manny Castañeda as Fairy Godmother, Leader of Planet Perfect
 Edwin Serrano as Alien Moreno / Agent Moreno / Master of Disguise
 Claire Ruiz as Venus
 Jasper Visaya as Paeng

See also
List of programs aired by TV5 (Philippine TV network)

References

External links
 
 

TV5 (Philippine TV network) original programming
2012 Philippine television series debuts
2013 Philippine television series endings
Philippine comedy television series
Philippine television sitcoms
Filipino-language television shows